Rachel Nicol (born February 16, 1993) is a Canadian competitive swimmer, who competes primarily in the breaststroke events. Nicol is a World medalist, and has also won two medals at the 2015 Pan American Games in Toronto and also won multiple medals at the inaugural Youth Olympics in Singapore.

Career
In 2016, she qualified for the Canadian National team for the 2016 Summer Olympics in the 100m breaststroke after setting a new personal best of 1:06.88.

In September 2017, Nicol was named to Canada's 2018 Commonwealth Games team.

Nicol medaled at the 2022 World Aquatics Championships as part of the Canadian team in the 4×100 m medley relay.

References

External links
 
 
 
 
 
 

1993 births
Living people
Canadian female breaststroke swimmers
Medalists at the FINA World Swimming Championships (25 m)
Sportspeople from Regina, Saskatchewan
Swimmers at the 2015 Pan American Games
Swimmers at the 2010 Summer Youth Olympics
Pan American Games silver medalists for Canada
Pan American Games bronze medalists for Canada
Swimmers at the 2016 Summer Olympics
Olympic swimmers of Canada
Pan American Games medalists in swimming
Swimmers at the 2018 Commonwealth Games
Youth Olympic gold medalists for Canada
Medalists at the 2015 Pan American Games
Commonwealth Games competitors for Canada
World Aquatics Championships medalists in swimming
Youth Olympic bronze medalists for Canada
SMU Mustangs women's swimmers